The following is a list of members of Fatah, a major Palestinian political party and militia founded sometime between 1958-1959. The list includes leaders, militants, commanders, governors, mayors and financiers that are associated with Fatah and its several various branches.

Former and present Members 
Mahmoud Abbas (former financier and present head of organization)
 Adnan Ghaith
Adil Abdel Kareem (founder)
Ahmad Abdelrahman (founder)
Ahmad Abu Reish (militant commander)
Anis al-Qaq (former deputy minister and ambassador)
Naif Abu Sharah (militant commander of al-Aqsa Martyrs Brigade branch)
Hani Abul Saoud (former financier)
Khaled al-Amira (founder)
Fathi Arafat
Moussa Arafat (former head of Fatah security forces)
Yasser Arafat (founder and former head of organization)
Nasser Badawi (militant commander)
Hakam Balawi (founder)
Hikmat Zaid (presidential advisor for provincial affairs, fatah consultative council member, former governor, mayor, ambassador, minister of agriculture, minister of communications)
Marwan Barghouti (head of Tanzim branch)
Mohamed Al Namura
Mohammed Dahlan (head of Fatah security forces) (terminated by Mahmoud Abbas)
Saeb Erakat (adviser)
Qadura Fares (governor)
Rawhi Fattouh (former head of organization)(founder)
Tala'at al-Ghossein (former financier)
Sakher Habash
Khaled al-Hassan (founder)
Uri Davis
Faisal Husseini   (founder)
Ghazi al-Jabali *Imil Jarjoui (mayor)
Farouk Kaddoumi 
Hani Kaddoumi
Fadi Kafisha
Nimer Saleh (Abu Saleh)(founder)
Majed Abu Sharar(founder)
Saed Sayel (Abu Al Waleed)(founder)
Soneh Dekha
Salah Khalaf (founder)
Salwa Abu Khadra
Abdel Fatah Lahmoud (founder)
Samir Mashharawi
Muhammad Youssef Al-Najjar (founder)
Muhsin al-Qattan 
Ahmed Qurei (former prime minister) (mayor)
Jibril Rajoub (mayor)
Ali Hassan Salameh (head of Black September and Force 17 branches)
Jamal Abu Samhadana
Sirhan Sirhan (militant associated with al-Aqsa Martyrs Brigades branch)
Yahya Skaf (militant)
Maslama Thabet
Khalil al-Wazir (founder)
Khaled Yashruti (founder)
Nasser Youssef
Zakaria Zubeidi (militant commander of al-Aqsa Martyrs Brigade Branch)
Zakaria al-Agha Head of Fateh in Gaza Strip (mayor)
Fouad H Alshobaki (founder) Brigade chief of finance and Yasser Arafat financial advisor